Cusseta  is a town in Chambers County, Alabama, United States.  Situated between Opelika and Lanett, it was named for the ancient Creek Indian town of Cusseta. As of the 2010 census, its population was 123.

Pat Garrett, the lawman famed for killing the outlaw Billy the Kid, was born near Cusseta in 1850.

The community was believed to be unincorporated until 2006, when rediscovered documents indicated that Cusseta had been incorporated as a city in 1853. As the community diminished in size over the years, its status was forgotten.

Demographics

See also
Fort Cusseta

References

Towns in Alabama
Populated places established in 1853
Towns in Chambers County, Alabama
Alabama placenames of Native American origin